Uwe Bredow (born 22 August 1961) is a German former footballer.

References

External links

1961 births
Living people
German footballers
East German footballers
East Germany under-21 international footballers
1. FC Lokomotive Leipzig players
Bundesliga players
2. Bundesliga players
Footballers from Leipzig
Association football midfielders
DDR-Oberliga players
People from Bezirk Leipzig